The Cynic is the debut studio album by English jazz composer Zoe Rahman, released in 2001 by Manushi Records.

Critical response

John Fordham of The Guardian said The Cynic "alerted audiences to her [Rahman's] independent musical life..." Michael Tucker of Jazz Journal said, "Never was an album more misleadingly titled..."

Track listing

Personnel
Musicians
Zoe Rahman – piano
Winston Clifford – drums
Jeremy Brown – bass

Awards and nominations

References

External links

2001 debut albums
Instrumental albums
Zoe Rahman albums